Cyrtodactylus limajalur, the  five-banded bent-toed gecko, is a species of gecko that is endemic to East Malaysia.

References 

Cyrtodactylus
Reptiles described in 2019